Nínive Clements Calegari is an educator in the United States. Following ten years of classroom experience in public schools, she became an author and founded a national literacy program, 826 National. She also founded The Teacher Salary Project. Currently she is the CEO of Enterprise for Youth, an organization that empowers young people to prepare for and discover career opportunities in the San Francisco area through a three-phase program model of job-readiness training, paid internships with college credit, and ongoing career development and networking support.

Biography
In May 2019, Calegari was awarded an Honorary Doctorate of Humane Letters from the University of San Francisco. For high school, Calegari went to Santa Catalina School and graduated in 1989,  later going to Middlebury College to receive her bachelor's degree in 1993 and a Masters in Teaching and Curriculum from the Harvard Graduate School of Education in 1995.
She worked at Leadership High School, San Francisco's first charter school, where she also served on the board of directors, and then taught in her family's hometown in Mexico.

Calegari was a co-founder of 826 Valencia in April 2002 and the founding executive director. The group and the seven other related chapters, including 826NYC, 826LA, 826 Seattle (which later moved on to become The Greater Seattle Bureau of Fearless Ideas), 826 Chicago, 826 Ann Arbor, 826 Boston and finally 826DC, all of which are a part of 826 National (which she also co-founded and headed) are a group of non-profit writing centers for students ages 6–18. Subsequently, 826-like models have been duplicated in 40 places around the world, including in London, Dublin, and Mexico.

Calegari, along with Dave Eggers and Daniel Moulthrop, co-authored The New York Times bestselling book Teachers Have It Easy: The Big Sacrifices and Small Salaries of America's Teachers, published by The New Press in 2005. It argues that increasing teachers' salaries is a critical part of a vibrant and functioning society, and essential to ensuring US students receive education from quality teachers.

Calegari founded and serves as CEO of The Teacher Salary Project, a non-profit designed to build the political will necessary to transform how US society values effective teachers. The project uses film, social media, and the general public to communicate its mission. The Teacher Salary Project's film, American Teacher, held its first preview screening in May 2011 at the San Francisco International Film Festival. It was also featured in numerous other film festivals, including the United Nations Association Film Festival and Philadelphia International Film Festival. The film was produced by Calegari and Eggers, and directed and produced by filmmaker Vanessa Roth.
The film is narrated by actor Matt Damon with music composed by San Francisco musician Thao Nguyen.

In 2008, Calegari was appointed by San Francisco Mayor Gavin Newsom to the San Francisco Arts Commission. She served on the board of Learning Points Associates (which later was merged with American Institutes of Research), as an advisor to the George Lucas Education Foundation., and then a board member for 18 Reasons.

In 2014, Calegari gave a TEDx talk at Santa Catalina School on the importance of valuing teachers. In 2015, Calegari and the Teacher Salary Project released two short films, Laney's story and Kory's story, which follow two teachers struggling to make ends meet on a teacher's salary. The two short films were featured in a video on ATTN: which received over 12 million views.

In 2018, Calegari was featured and honored as a Homework Hero on ABC-7 as part of Women's History Month for her work with 826 Valencia and 826 National.

In 2019, Calegari appeared on MSNBC to discuss the teacher's pay gap based on her work with The Teacher Salary Project. In May 2019, she gave the commencement address for the School of Education and received an honorary degree, the Doctor of Humane Letters, from the University of San Francisco for her work both in the city of San Francisco and nationwide.

Awards 
Calegari has been the recipient of a National Endowment for the Humanities Fellowship, the William Coe Award for study at Stanford University and the Andrew Mellon Fellowship. In 2007, Calegari received Edutopia's 2007 Daring Dozen award.

The Jim Henson Community Honor in 2010 was awarded to 826 National. Calegari was awarded the Hidden Villa Humanitarian Award, along with Dave Eggers, in September 2016. Calegari and Eggers were given the Jefferson Award for their work with 826 Valencia in November 2016.

Recipient of the Doctor of Humane Letters, Honoris Causa, University of San Francisco, School of Education, May 16, 2019.

Works
 
 
 
  "Op-Ed" contribution.

References

External links
 
Interview, scottishbooktrust.com; accessed August 23, 2017.
ABC-7, KGO-TV, San Francisco, CA (October 20, 2008)
Video of ABC-7 Profile of Excellence on Calegari, youtube.com; accessed August 23, 2017.
Actions Speak Loudest; accessed August 23, 2017.
CNN story; accessed August 23, 2017.
Baba, Hana. (November 23, 2015). Interview: Elevating Teaching as a Profession 
 "Stories from the Field", Middlebury.edu; accessed August 23, 2017. 
ABC-7, Honored as Homework Hero March 30, 2019
MSNBC appearance discussing teacher pay gap March 27, 2019
Commencement address and honorary doctorate at USF's School of Education May 16, 2019

American writers of Mexican descent
Living people
Middlebury College alumni
Harvard Graduate School of Education alumni
Place of birth missing (living people)
Year of birth missing (living people)
People from the San Francisco Bay Area
Schoolteachers from California
American women educators
21st-century American women